The 1968 Kham Duc C-130 shootdown was the aircraft shootdown of a United States Air Force Lockheed C-130B Hercules aircraft during the Battle of Kham Duc on May 12, 1968. Everyone on board, 183 Vietnamese civilians, one U.S. Special Forces officer, and 5 U.S. Air Force crewmen, were killed. At the time, it was the deadliest aircraft crash in history, is currently the deadliest aviation incident on Vietnamese soil, and remained the deadliest loss of a U.S. military aircraft until Arrow Air Flight 1285 in 1985.

The aircraft, commanded by Major Bernard L. Bucher, was participating in the evacuation of South Vietnamese civilians from the Kham Duc campsite. The C-130 approached the Kham Duc airstrip from the south and managed to land despite taking hits from opposing North Vietnamese forces. As soon as it landed, 183 South Vietnamese rushed onto the aircraft. Once the aircraft was full, Major Bucher proceeded to take off in a northward direction, unaware that the North Vietnamese were concentrated in that area. According to eyewitness reports, the aircraft, under intense anti-aircraft fire from 12.7mm and 14.5mm heavy machine guns, shook violently out of control, crashed into a nearby ravine less than a mile (1.6 km) from the end of the airstrip, and burned, killing all of the evacuees, the Special Forces officer, and the aircraft's crew of five.

References

1968 in Vietnam
Aviation accidents and incidents in 1968
Aviation accidents and incidents in Vietnam
20th-century aircraft shootdown incidents
Accidents and incidents involving United States Air Force aircraft
May 1968 events in Asia
Accidents and incidents involving the Lockheed C-130 Hercules